Colombia at the 1948 Summer Olympics in London, England was the nation's third appearance at the eleventh edition of the Summer Olympic Games. An all-male national team of six male athletes competed in six events in three sports.

Athletics

Fencing

Two fencers, both men, represented Colombia in 1948.

Men's foil
 Roberto Camargo

Men's épée
 Roberto Camargo
 Alfonso Ahumada

Swimming

See also
Sports in Colombia

References

External links
Official Olympic Reports

Nations at the 1948 Summer Olympics
1948 Summer Olympics
O